The 2011 mid-year rugby union tests featured only seven matches due to the upcoming 2011 Rugby World Cup. No test series took place, although the Barbarians did play two matches in the United Kingdom; England and Wales. New Zealand and Australia hosted a respective Tier 2 side, Australia hosted Samoa, New Zealand hosted Fiji. Argentina hosted the French Barbarians, while Japan played a Top League XV side in Tokyo.

This was the first time since 1973, and only the second in the past 50 years, that no team representing the Home Unions (England, Ireland, Scotland, Wales, or the British and Irish Lions) toured the southern hemisphere in the mid-year window.

Fixtures

Week 1

As is typical for Barbarians matches, this was an uncapped match for England.
The traditionally uncapped player of the Barbarians side was Tim Visser. (Willie Mason was also uncapped in rugby union but he was capped in rugby league, having switched codes a few weeks before the game when signing to Toulon.) Visser qualified for Scotland on residency grounds in June 2012 and now represents that country internationally.

Week 2

Notes:
Unlike most Barbarians matches, this was a fully capped match for Wales. As a result, Stephen Jones earned his 100th Wales cap in this match.
The uncapped players on this Barbarians squad were Brock James and Lloyd Williams. As noted earlier, Willie Mason is uncapped in union as a recent code convert, but capped in league.

Week 3

Week 4

Week 5

Week 6

See also
Mid-year rugby union test series
2011 Rugby World Cup warm-up tests
2011 end-of-year rugby union tests
2011 Asian Five Nations
2011 IRB Churchill Cup
2011 IRB Pacific Nations Cup
2011 IRB Nations Cup

References

2011
2010–11 in European rugby union
2010 in Oceanian rugby union
2010–11 in Japanese rugby union
2010 in South American rugby union